Gonca Türkeli-Dehnert (born 3 December 1975 in Berlin) is a German administrative lawyer and government official in North Rhine-Westphalia.

Early life and education 
After graduating from the Französisches Gymnasium Berlin, she studied law at the Free University of Berlin. From 2003 to 2005, before passing her higher legal examination, she worked at the Kammergericht in Berlin.

Career
In October 2021, she became State Secretary for Integration in North Rhine-Westphalia in the First Wüst cabinet, replacing Serap Güler, who was elected to the Bundestag.

After the 2022 North Rhine-Westphalia state election, she became the State Secretary in the Ministry of Culture and Science in the Second Wüst cabinet.

Personal life
Türkeli-Dehnert is divorced. She has one child. She is a member of the Christian Democratic Union.

References 

1975 births
Living people
German women lawyers
21st-century German civil servants
People from Berlin
Französisches Gymnasium Berlin alumni
Free University of Berlin alumni